Yellow Submarine Songtrack is a compilation/soundtrack album by the English rock band the Beatles, released in 1999 to coincide with a re-release of the 1968 animated film Yellow Submarine that same year. The film was re-released on 13 September 1999 in the United Kingdom and the following day in the United States. In contrast with other Beatles remasters available, the songs were fully remixed by Peter Cobbin at Abbey Road Studios from the original multitrack tapes, something not done for the original CD release of the Beatles catalogue in the late 1980s (except for Help! and Rubber Soul), nor the 2009 remastered albums.

Yellow Submarine Songtrack contains all but one of the Beatles songs used in the film ("A Day in the Life" being excluded), including several that were not included on the original 1969 Yellow Submarine album. The additional tracks replaced the George Martin film score from the original release, while Martin's complete score was included as a DVD audio track in the CD/DVD package featuring the album and film.

The album debuted in the UK charts at number 8, selling 19,000 copies in its first week. It also peaked at number 15 on the Billboard 200, with 68,000 copies sold in its opening week. In France the album debuted at number 13.

Yellow Submarine Songtrack was reissued on CD on 4 June 2012 (5 June in North America) along with the film restored for DVD and Blu-ray release. While the original 1999 release was in a jewel-case, the 2012 version was released in a card sleeve, with the booklet and catalog numbers the same as the earlier version, with a 1999 copyright date on the disc, and a 2012 date on the card sleeve. The sleeve was in the same format as the Beatles 2009 remasters, being slightly rectangular with "The Beatles" logo in the left hand side of the cover.

Structure 

The remixed tracks of the album feature many alterations and adjustments from the original stereo recordings. Almost all of the Beatles songs included in the film are on Yellow Submarine Songtrack. An exception is "A Day in the Life", which EMI chose to exclude from the Songtrack in order to limit the number of songs from Sgt. Pepper's Lonely Hearts Club Band.

The title track, "Yellow Submarine", contains the line "a life of ease" (delivered by John Lennon) that had been missing in prior stereo mixes of the song. The replies from Lennon to the main lyric are gradually panned and faded from the right side of the stereo field to the left. The sound effects in this version are also more pronounced.

"Hey Bulldog" was entirely recorded on only one four-track tape. The piano and drum performances were recorded together onto one track and were inseparable for a new mix. They remain on the left audio channel while the vocals and the snare overdubs performed by drummer Ringo Starr are centred.

The prior stereo version of "Love You To", featuring lead vocals by George Harrison, contains a shorter fade than the initial mono recording. This shortening is retained in the Songtrack version.

Acoustic guitars and percussion are situated at the left channel for the new mix of "All Together Now". The lead vocals, by Lennon and Paul McCartney, are centred while the chorus is split across the left and right. The background vocals heard on the second verse are more audible and the guitar is clearer.

The Songtrack version of "Only a Northern Song" marked the appearance of the song for the first time in true stereo. The original 1969 stereo album featured a synthesised Duophonic variant of the original mono version. A stereo mix of this song also appeared on the Anthology 2 compilation album, but was made up of alternative takes featuring different overdubs and lyrics.

Additional promotion 

A number of promotions were launched to accompany the re-release of Yellow Submarine film and the remixed Songtrack in 1999. These include a commemorative postage stamp series, action figures of the main characters and a variety of assorted Yellow Submarine merchandise, such as mousepads. Additionally, an 18-coach, London-to-Paris Eurostar train was repainted with Yellow Submarine designs; the relivery, which cost over $160,000, was paid for by McCartney, Harrison and Starr. In addition, a life-size yellow submarine was taken out on a publicity tour across the globe.

Track listing 
All songs written by Lennon–McCartney, except for tracks with asterisks, which are written by George Harrison.

The CD/DVD package contains the album, as well as a DVD of the film with a remixed and remastered soundtrack, the original 1968 mono film soundtrack, and an isolated track of George Martin's complete score.
 
This album was also available on a yellow vinyl LP, with tracks 1–9 on side one and 10–15 on side two.

Charts

Weekly charts

Year-end charts

Certifications

References

External links 
 

1999 compilation albums
Albums produced by George Martin
Animated film soundtracks
The Beatles soundtracks
EMI Records compilation albums
Capitol Records compilation albums
Apple Records compilation albums
EMI Records soundtracks
The Beatles' Yellow Submarine
Capitol Records soundtracks
Apple Records soundtracks
The Beatles remix albums
Albums recorded at Olympic Sound Studios